The 2020 Paris–Roubaix was a one-day road cycling race scheduled to take place on 12 April 2020, but was postponed to 25 October 2020 due to the COVID-19 pandemic. However, on 9 October 2020, the race was cancelled due to an increase of coronavirus cases in France.

It would have been the 118th edition of Paris–Roubaix and the 23rd event of the 2020 UCI World Tour.

Teams
All nineteen UCI WorldTeams were invited automatically and obliged to enter a team in the race. Six UCI Professional Continental teams had been invited.

UCI WorldTeams

 
 
 
 
 
 
 
 
 
 
 
 
 
 
 
 
 
 
 

UCI Professional Continental teams

References

Paris-Roubaix
Paris-Roubaix
Paris–Roubaix
Paris–Roubaix